U Zaboravu is the second Serbo-Croatian studio album by Macedonian pop musician Karolina Gočeva which was released in Serbia, Montenegro, Bosnia & Herzegovina and in Croatia.

Promotion
Karolina had a glamorous start of her promotion for the fourth Macedonian and second Serbo-Croatian album in Skopje. She continued with her promotion in the Former Yugoslav cities Belgrade, Sarajevo, Banja Luka and Podgorica.

Track listings
 "Teško Srcu Pada"
 "Umirem Bez Tebe"
 "Prvi Mart"
 "Gorka Pilula"
 "U Zaboravu"
 "Plovimo"
 "Lažem Sebe"
 "Ljubav"
 "Kao Malo Vode"
 "Kad Mi Nebo Bude Dom"
 "Još Samo Jedan Dan"

Bonus Tracks
"Ruža Ružica"
music: Zlatko Origjanskiarrangement: Zlatko Origjanskilyrics: Zlatko Origjanski

Release history

Awards
Sunčane Skale
 Video Of The Year ("Lažem Sebe") link

References

2005 albums
2006 albums
Karolina Gočeva albums